Mecomma ambulans is a species of bugs in the Miridae family that can be found throughout Europe (except for Portugal) and the far north, and through the Palearctic as far east as China. The species have black pronotum with brown wings and yellow legs, all of which is similar to Tupiocoris rhododendri.

References

Insects described in 1807
Hemiptera of Europe
Hemiptera of Asia
Orthotylini